Tom or Thomas Kelleher may refer to:
 Tom Kelleher (Irish republican), member of the Irish Republican Army in the late 1920s
 Tom Kelleher (American football) (1925–2011), American football official
 Tom Kelleher, rugby player; see list of United States national rugby union players
 Thomas F. Kelleher, American justice (see list of justices of the Rhode Island Supreme Court)